Richmound is a village in the Canadian province of Saskatchewan within the Rural Municipality of Enterprise No. 142 and Census Division No. 8. The economy is driven in large part by the oil and gas sector as well as agriculture. The area was originally settled by Germans, mostly Catholics from South Russia.

The village has a community hall, church, skating arena, curling rink, ball diamonds, stores, and a hotel. The K-12 School was closed in 2008, and students are now bussed to a neighbouring village.

Local lore states that Richmond, British Columbia is actually named after Richmound. It is said that the founding fathers of Richmond BC simply forgot to add the 'U' in a classic (and historical) spelling error.

History 
Richmound incorporated as a village on May 5, 1947.

Demographics 

See also

 List of communities in Saskatchewan
 Villages of Saskatchewan

References

External links

Villages in Saskatchewan
Enterprise No. 142, Saskatchewan
Division No. 8, Saskatchewan